Hermes-Berthecourt is a railway station located in the communes of Hermes and Berthecourt in the Oise department, France.  The station is served by TER Hauts-de-France trains from Creil to Beauvais.

The station was the terminus of a secondary line to Persan-Beaumont operated by the Compagnie du chemin de fer de Hermes à Beaumont ("Hermes - Beaumont Railway Company").

References

Railway stations in Oise